Alain Rayes  (born December 11, 1971) is a Canadian politician, who was elected to represent the riding of Richmond—Arthabaska in the House of Commons of Canada in the 2015 Canadian federal election, and reelected in the 2019 and 2021 elections. From 2017 to 2019 and 2021 to 2022, Rayes served as Conservative leader Andrew Scheer as well as Erin O'Toole's Quebec lieutenant.

Before federal politics, Rayes served for six years as the mayor of Victoriaville.

Biography
Alain Rayes is a native of Victoriaville, He  is the eldest of four children of a family originally from Egypt. He earned a bachelor of mathematics, specialising in teaching computer science, and later a masters in educational administration. He began his career as a teacher before obtaining management positions, including Director of the Polyvalente Le Boisé Victoriaville.

Provincial and municipal politics 
Rayes began his political career as a candidate for the ADQ alongside Mario Dumont, finishing second in Arthabaska during the 2003 Quebec general election. He transitioned to municipal politics and was elected mayor of Victoriaville in Quebec's 2009 municipal elections, and was reelected in 2013 by acclamation.

Under Rayes' mayoralty in Victoriaville, activities included the construction of the cultural venue "Le Carré 150" Pool Édouard-Dubord, of Yvon-Paré Stadium, Gateway Beaudet reservoir, the park's entertainment site at the youth baseball place of Victoriaville Stadium, Sani-Marc sports Complex and the sport Complex Promutuel.

Federal politics
After six years as mayor, Rayes decided to enter federal politics and was elected in October 2015 as the Conservative member for Richmond-Arthabaska. Upon his election as MP, he was appointed deputy spokesman for Public Safety and Emergency Preparedness. Within this portfolio, Rayes was charge of the marijuana legalization issue. His public interventions were on the issue of electoral reform as he was identified with Gérard Deltell, among the official spokesmen of the party on this issue. Then in July 2016, Rona Ambrose, the interim leader of the Conservative Party, put him in charge of deputy spokesman for Foreign Affairs before becoming spokesman partner on infrastructure, communities and Urban Affairs in September and entering the shadow cabinet soon its first year.

After Andrew Scheer won the 2017 Conservative Party of Canada leadership election, Rayes served as his Quebec lieutenant from 2017 to 2019. On September 2, 2020, Rayes was succeeded by Richard Martel as the party's Quebec lieutenant. Rayes returned to the role on November 8, 2021, and served until resigning on February 6, 2022 in order to play a role in the Conservative leadership election.

On September 13, 2022, Rayes left the Conservative caucus following Pierre Poilievre's victory in the leadership race on September 10, 2022. Rayes said that his values were incompatible with the new leadership and that he self-identified as a "Progressive Conservative". He will continue to sit as an independent in the House. On September 14 2022, Rayes told the National Post that he suspected that Poilievre’s leadership team tried to intimidate Rayes by sending text messages to Conservative members of Richmond-Arthabaska in order to pressure Rayes into resigning his seat. Within the same day, the party admitted and apologized to the members of the riding by sending a tweet but not directly apologizing to Rayes. The day later, Rayes released a statement on Twitter noting the apology was not directed personally towards him but "will let the population judge their message" and wants to move on from leaving the party.

Electoral record

Federal

Provincial

Municipal

References

External links

 - Alain Rayes MP

1971 births
Canadian politicians of Egyptian descent
Living people
Action démocratique du Québec candidates in Quebec provincial elections
Canadian educators
Canadian people of Lebanese descent
Conservative Party of Canada MPs
Mayors of Victoriaville
Members of the House of Commons of Canada from Quebec
21st-century Canadian politicians